The Greek Catholic Co-cathedral of Saints Cyril and Methodius is the historicistic co-cathedral church of the Greek Catholic Eparchy of Križevci. It belongs to the Vicariate of Diocese of Žumberak-Križevci. It is located in the Street of St. Cyril and Methodius on the Upper Town in Zagreb, near St. Mark's Square.

History
A Greek Catholic church and seminary (built in 1681) existed on the Upper Town before the 17th century. This church was intended for the Greek Catholic believers, mostly people from Žumberak Mountains, Uskoks and clerics that lived in and around Zagreb. It is not possible to determine when the Church was built because a fire that broke out in 1766 destroyed most of the Church's books that would give a precise date. This first church was dedicated to Basil the Great.

The current church dedicated to St. Cyril and Methodius was built in 1886 during the reign of Bishop Ilija Hranilović on the site of the former church of St. Basil. The parish uses the facilities of the Greek Catholic Seminary in Zagreb that is connected to the Church which gives room that serves as a parish office, and, since 1932, a hall with sacristy.

The present church
The co-cathedral was designed by Hermann Bollé. It is built in the neo-Byzantine style of historicism. The co-cathedral owns a rich collection of paintings by Ivan Tišov, as well as icons by E.A. Bučevski and professor . There are three bells in the 50m high co-cathedral's belfry. Largest bell weights 782 kg and is dedicated to St. Cyril and Methodius, medium bell that weight 395 kg is dedicated to the Mother of God and small bell that weights 230 kg and is dedicated to Basil the Great. The Co-cathedral owns a precious cross for tetrapod, reliquary, and two capes, as well as set of kit icon mounted on wood for the cross.

References

Greek Catholic cathedrals in Croatia
Religious buildings and structures in Zagreb
Basilica churches in Croatia
Churches completed in 1886
Gornji Grad–Medveščak
Hermann Bollé buildings